Diego Longo (born 25 January 1976) is an Italian football manager.

Career
In 2005, Longo was appointed assistant manager of Romanian side Rapid. In 2019, he was appointed assistant manager of Al Hilal (Saudi Arabia) in Saudi Arabia.

References

External links
Diego Longo at playmakerstats.com

Italian football managers
Expatriate football managers in Ukraine
Expatriate football managers in Saudi Arabia
Expatriate football managers in Romania
Expatriate football managers in Greece
Expatriate football managers in Albania
Italian expatriate sportspeople in Qatar
Italian expatriate sportspeople in Saudi Arabia
Italian expatriate sportspeople in Romania
Italian expatriate sportspeople in Greece
Italian expatriate sportspeople in Ukraine
Italian expatriate sportspeople in Albania
Kategoria Superiore managers
FK Kukësi managers
1976 births
Living people